Fadhila Rebhi is a Tunisian politician who served as Minister of Trade and Export Development in the Bouden Cabinet.

On 6 January 2023, she was sacked by Prime Minister Najla Bouden as a result of the worsening economic crisis.

References 

Living people
Year of birth missing (living people)
Place of birth missing (living people)
Trade ministers of Tunisia
21st-century Tunisian politicians
21st-century Tunisian women politicians
Women government ministers of Tunisia